Star Power: Sharon's Search for the Next Female Pop Superstar is a Philippine reality talent show airing on ABS-CBN. The show premiered October 10, 2010, and is hosted by Sharon Cuneta, Erik Santos, and Christian Bautista.

The program aimed to develop 15- to 21-year-old female singers into becoming the next female singing superstar. Regional-wide searches began in Metro Manila, Luzon, Visayas and Mindanao from August to September 2010.

Weekly Themes
Each week of the show had a particular theme.
 October 24, 31 and November 7, 2010: My Story, My Song
 October 24, 2010: First batch - Camille, Glaiza, Angeline, Laurice, Rheena, Macy, Sam
 October 31, 2010: Second batch - Pauline, Ninay, Kaye, Joy, Akiko, Cristele, Krissel
 November 7, 2010: Third batch - Rose Ann, Jizelle, Mia, Natasia, K-La, Monica
 November 14, 2010: Songs of Dedication and Thankfulness
 November 21, 2010: Favorite Things and Persons
 November 28, 2010: Versatility (Songs Chosen by their Co-Finalists)
 December 5, 2010: Sing and Dance Week
 December 12, 2010: Arnel Pineda's Choice
 December 19, 2010: Christmas Special (Non-Elimination Round)
 With Jed Madela
 With Aiza Seguerra and Princess of ASAP Sessionistas
 December 26, 2010: Requested Songs by Kapamilya Leading Men
 January 2, 2011: Prof. Kitchy Molina's Choice
 January 9, 2011: Mega Song Choice (Birthday Tribute)
 January 16, 2011: Celebrity Duets
 January 30, 2011: Performance with Sessionistas
 February 6, 2011: Showdown of Showmanship
 February 13, 2011: Homecoming Special and Classic OPM Love Songs
 February 20, 2011: Star Power Grand Showdown (Personal Choice, Judges' Choice, Star Records Compositions)
Red for Akiko
Green for Angeline
Pink for K-La
Yellow for Krissel
Blue for Monica

Star Power 5 Grand Finalists

Angeline Quinto  was a grand finalist of "Star For A Night", the batch where Sarah Geronimo won in 2002. Prior to Star Power, she joined in GMA 7's variety show Diz Iz It! for "Diz Iz Kantahan: Challenge the Champion", where she was a wildcard finalist this year.

 Habang May Buhay - Wency Cornejo, October 24, 2010
 Paano Kita Mapapasalamatan - Sarah Geronimo, November 14, 2010
I Don't Want to Miss a Thing - Aerosmith, November 21, 2010
 Don't Cry Out Loud - Rachelle Ann Go, November 28, 2010
 Single Ladies - Beyoncé, December 5, 2010
 Love of My Life - Queen, December 12, 2010
 Pasko Na Sinta Ko - With Jed Madela, December 19, 2010
 How Did You Know - Gary Valenciano, December 26, 2010 (Requested by Zanjoe Marudo)
 Through The Fire - Chaka Khan, January 2, 2011
 Ikaw - Sharon Cuneta, January 9, 2011
 I Finally Found Someone - Bryan Adams and Barbra Streisand, with Jett Pangan January 16, 2011
 These Dreams - Heart (with Juris Fernandez and Nina Girado), January 30, 2011
 Love The Way You Lie - Rihanna, with Monica, February 6, 2011
 Ang Lahat ng Ito'y Para sa 'Yo - Hajji Alejandro, February 13, 2011
 What Kind of Fool Am I - Regine Velasquez , February 20, 2011
 I Don't Want to Miss a Thing - Aerosmith , February 20, 2011
 Patuloy Ang Pangarap - Original Song composed by Jonathan Manalo, February 20, 2011, Winner

Krissel Valdez was a band vocalist from Davao City. According to her, being in Star Power was her first singing contest on Philippine television that she ever joined.

 I Believe I Can Fly - R. Kelly, October 31, 2010
 You've Made Me So Very Happy - Blood, Sweat and Tears, November 14, 2010
 Sweet Love - Anita Baker, November 21, 2010
 Ikaw Ang Pangarap - Martin Nievera, November 28, 2010
 One Night Only - Dreamgirls, December 5, 2010
 Someday - Nina, December 12, 2010
 Pasko Na Sinta Ko - with Jed Madela, December 19, 2010
 You And Me - Lifehouse, December 26, 2010 (Requested by Derek Ramsay)
 A Moment Like This - Kelly Clarkson, January 2, 2011
 Kung Ako Na Lang Sana - Sharon Cuneta, January 9, 2011
 Whenever You Call - Mariah Carey and Brian Mcknight, with Bugoy Drilon January 16, 2011
 Reasons - Earth, Wind and Fire (with Duncan Ramos and Juris Fernandez), January 30, 2011
 Alejandro - Lady Gaga, with K-La, February 6, 2011
 Nais Ko - Basil Valdez, February 13, 2011
 And I'm Telling You - Jennifer Holliday, February 20, 2011
 Someday - Nina, February 20, 2011
 Higher - Original Song composed by Gino Torres, February 20, 2011, Second Place

Monica Sacay was a 15-year-old contestant from Ormoc, Leyte. At her young age, her parents died and she is now living with her foster parents.

 Pangarap na Bituin - Sharon Cuneta, November 7, 2010
 I Can - Regine Velasquez, November 14, 2010
 Kailan - Smokey Mountain November 21, 2010
 Bring Me to Life - Evanescence, November 28
 If You Could Read My Mind - Stars on 54, December 5, 2010
 Blue Bayou - Linda Ronstadt, December 12, 2010
 Nakaraang Pasko - with Jed Madela, December 19, 2010
 'Till My Heartaches End - Carol Banawa, December 26, 2010 (Requested by Gerald Anderson)
 Through The Rain - Mariah Carey, January 2, 2011
 Now That You're Gone - Sharon Cuneta, January 9, 2011
 Fever - Michael Bublé, with Richard Poon January 16, 2011
 Superstar - The Carpenters, (with Sitti Navarro and Richard Poon), January 30, 2011
 You Belong With Me - Taylor Swift, with Krissel, February 6, 2011
 Ngayon - Basil Valdez, February 13, 2011
 This Is My Now - Jordin Sparks, February 20, 2011
 Through The Rain - Mariah Carey, February 20, 2011
 Keep On Dreaming - Original Song composed by Jonathan Manalo and Rox Santos, February 20, 2011 Third Place

K-La Rivera is a Fil-Canadian. She was discovered by Willie Revillame in Wowowee and sings in the said noontime show.

 You Are Not Alone - Michael Jackson, November 7, 2010
 Greatest Love Of All - Whitney Houston, November 14, 2010
 Inseparable - Natalie Cole, November 21, 2010
 It Might Be You - Stephen Bishop, November 28, 2010
 I Wanna Dance With Somebody- Whitney Houston, December 5, 2010
 You Light Up My Life - Barbra Streisand, December 12, 2010
 Nakaraang Pasko - With Aiza Seguerra and Princess of ASAP Sessionistas, December 19, 2010
 Teenage Dream - Katy Perry, December 26, 2010 (Requested by Sam Milby)
 Stand Up For Love - Destiny's Child, January 2, 2011
 Hagkan - Sharon Cuneta, January 9, 2011
 When You Believe - Mariah Carey and Whitney Houston, with Vina Morales January 16, 2011
 Emotions - Destiny's Child (with Sitti Navarro and Nina Girado), January 30, 2011
 Thinking of You - Katy Perry with Akiko Solon, February 6, 2011
 Dito Ba - Kuh Ledesma, February 13, 2011
 Listen - Beyoncé, February 20, 2011
 It Might Be You - Stephen Bishop, February 20, 2011, Eliminated - Fourth Place

Akiko Solon was once a Monthly Finalist in Little Big Star Cebu. She won the Josenian Got Talent 2010 Grand Championship.

 I Believe- Fantasia Barrino, October 31, 2010
 Salamat - Yeng Constantino, November 14, 2010
 Last Dance - Donna Summer, November 21, 2010
 Home - Diana Ross, November 28, 2010
 Beautiful Liar - Beyoncé, December 5, 2010
 Nakapagtataka - APO Hiking Society, December 12, 2010
 Pasko Na Sinta Ko - With Jed Madela, December 19, 2010
 Home - Chris Daughtry, December 26, 2010 (Requested by John Lloyd Cruz)
 Its All Coming Back To Me Now - Celine Dion, January 2, 2011
 Sana'y Wala Ng Wakas - Sharon Cuneta, January 9, 2011
 Bleeding Love - Leona Lewis, with Yeng Constantino January 16, 2011
 Making Love Out of Nothing At All - Air Supply, (with Princess Velasco and Aiza Seguerra), January 30, 2011
 You're Love Is My Drug - Ke$ha, with Angeline Quinto, February 6, 2011
 Magsimula Ka - Leo Valdez, February 13, 2011
 Deja Vu - Beyoncé, February 20, 2011, Eliminated - Fifth Place

Star Power Final 12
Ninay Lescano  is a disc jockey from Batangas who is known for her redhead fashion statement.

 On My Own - Whitney Houston, October 31, 2010
 I'll Be There for You - Aiza Seguerra, November 14, 2010
 Picture of You - Boyzone, November 21, 2010
 I Want To Know What Love Is - Mariah Carey, November 28, 2010
 Whenever, Wherever - Shakira, December 5, 2010
 My Immortal - Evanescence, December 12, 2010
 Pasko Na Sinta Ko - With Jed Madela, December 19, 2010
 Naalala Ka - Rey Valera, December 26, 2010 (Requested by Jericho Rosales) Eliminated - January 2, 2011

Kaye Racho

 Breakaway - Kelly Clarkson, October 31, 2010
 There You'll Be - Faith Hill, November 14, 2010
 Huwag Na Huwag Mong Sasabihin - Kitchie Nadal, November 21, 2010
 I'll Never Love This Way Again - Dionne Warwick, November 28, 2010
 Waking Up in Vegas - Katy Perry, December 5, 2010
 Alone - Heart, December 12, 2010
 Nakaraang Pasko - With Aiza Seguerra and Princess of ASAP Sessionistas, December 19, 2010 Eliminated - December 26, 2010

Macy delos Reyes (17, Pop Charmer of Cebu)

 True Colors - Cyndi Lauper, October 24, 2010
 You're The Inspiration - Peter Cetera, November 14, 2010
 I Need You - LeAnn Rimes, November 21, 2010
 Better Days - Dianne Reeves, November 28, 2010
 Disturbia - Rihanna, December 5, 2010, Eliminated - December 12, 2010

Laurice Bermillo (15, Aspiring Star of Bataan)
She was a previous contestant in the second season of Little Big Star where she placed fourth in the grand finals of Big Division.

 Only Hope - Mandy Moore, October 24, 2010
 Angels Brought Me Here - Carrie Underwood, November 14, 2010
 You've Got A Friend - James Taylor, November 21, 2010
 A House Is Not a Home - Luther Vandross, November 28, 2010
 Closer - Ne-Yo, December 5, 2010, Eliminated - December 12, 2010

Rose Ann Francisco (15, Singing Bida from Batangas City)

 I'll Be Alright - Sarah Geronimo, November 7, 2010
 Dahil Minahal Mo Ako - Sarah Geronimo, November 14, 2010
 Ikaw - Sarah Geronimo, November 21, 2010
 Brick By Boring Brick - Paramore, November 28, 2010, Eliminated - December 5, 2010

Natasia Cunanan (20, Precious Voice from Bulacan)

 Iingatan Ka - Carol Banawa, November 7, 2010
 You Are My Song - Regine Velasquez, November 14, 2010
 Rainbow - South Border, November 21, 2010, Eliminated - November 28, 2010

Sam Hernandez (16, All Out Performer from Taguig)

 I Turn to You - Christina Aguilera, October 24, 2010
 Thanks to You - Tyler Collins, November 14, 2010
 I Dreamed a Dream - Susan Boyle, November 21, 2010, Eliminated - November 28, 2010

Semi-finals

 Pauline Lutero (15, Makati City)
 Manalig Ka - Laarni Lozada, October 31, 2010
 Wind Beneath My Wings - Bette Midler, November 14, 2010, Eliminated - November 21, 2010

 Joy Laquinario (19, Davao)
 You'll Never Walk Alone - Regine Velasquez, October 31, 2010
 Healing - Deniece Williams, November 14, 2010, Eliminated - November 21, 2010

 Mia Flores (18, Mandaluyong)
 Listen - Beyoncé, November 7, 2010
 At Your Side - The Corrs, November 14, 2010, Eliminated- November 21, 2010

 Camille Peralta (18, Plaridel, Bulacan)
 Lipad ng Pangarap - Gary Valenciano, October 24, 2010, Eliminated- November 7, 2010

 Glaiza Micua (18, Taguig City)
 If I Ain't Got You - Alicia Keys, October 24, 2010, Eliminated - November 7, 2010

 Rheena Ferrer (18, Makati City)
 The Time of My Life - David Cook, October 24, 2010, Eliminated- November 7, 2010

 Cristele Rein Gonzales (15, Compostela Valley)
 Note To God - Charice, October 31, 2010, Eliminated - November 7, 2010

Jizelle Formilleza (16, Compostela Valley)
 The Voice Within - Christina Aguilera, November 7, 2010, Eliminated - November 7, 2010

Mentors
 November 28, 2010 - Annie Quintos (The Company)
 December 5, 2010 - Georcelle Dapat
 December 12, 2010 - Arnel Pineda
 December 26, 2010 - Zsa Zsa Padilla
 January 2, 2011 - Prof. Kitchy Molina of University of the Philippines' College of Music

Round 1 Theme: Her Choice

Round 2 Theme: Judge Choice Song

Round 3 Theme: Original Composition

Total of The Showdown

Elimination chart
In each round, contestants were ranked to separate the lowest 4 ("Low4"). In the final rounds, there were 4 runners-up.

Guesting
 ASAP XV
 Banana Split

References

External links
Official website
 http://www.showbiz-portal.com/2010/11/top-three-finalist-in-star-powers-final.html

ABS-CBN original programming
2010 Philippine television series debuts
2011 Philippine television series endings
Philippine reality television series
Singing talent shows
Talent shows
Filipino-language television shows
Television series about teenagers